Maazullah Khan (born 1 September 1947) is a former Pakistani cricketer and cricket administrator who played first-class cricket in Pakistan from 1966 to 1984. He toured England in 1974 with the Pakistan team but did not play Test cricket.

Playing career
An off-spin bowler and useful lower-order batsman, Maazullah was the leading player for the weak Peshawar and North-West Frontier Province teams from the late 1960s to the mid-1970s. He captained Peshawar from 1970-71 to 1977-78. In his first match as captain he took 4 for 18 and 6 for 42 to give Peshawar a rare innings victory over Pakistan Air Force.

In 1973-74 he made his first century (which was also his first fifty), a score of 130 for Peshawar against Lahore B. Later in the season, playing for North-West Frontier Province Governor's XI against the Sri Lankan touring team, he took 8 for 97.

Maazullah was selected in the 17-man side to tour England in 1974, probably more in order to give North-West Frontier Province a representative than for his Test potential. He played only four of the 17 first-class matches and took one wicket from 68 overs, along with three catches and one run.

He scored a second century in 1977-78, 119 for Peshawar against Combined Services. He left first-class cricket after the 1977-78 season, but returned for three matches for Peshawar between October 1983 and October 1984. His last match was also the last first-class match for Majid Khan.

Administrative career
According to Peter Oborne, as captain and later as administrator Maazullah Khan encouraged two generations of Khyber Pakhtunkhwa cricketers. One of his protégés was the left-arm spinner Farrukh Zaman.

He served as Khyber Pakhtunkhwa Province director of sports, and refereed first-class and List A matches in Peshawar in the mid-1990s.

The Maazullah Khan Cricket Academy, named in his honour, is part of the Peshawar Sports Complex, which includes Arbab Niaz Stadium.

References

External links
 Maazullah Khan at CricketArchive
 Maazullah Khan at Cricinfo

1947 births
Living people
Pashtun people
Pakistani cricketers
Peshawar cricketers
Punjab (Pakistan) cricketers
Pakistan Railways cricketers
Khyber Pakhtunkhwa cricketers
Pakistani cricket administrators
Cricketers from Peshawar